Parliamentary elections were held in Greece on 7 April 1885. Supporters of Theodoros Deligiannis emerged as the largest bloc in Parliament, with 170 of the 245 seats. Deligiannis became Prime Minister on 1 May.

Results

References

Greece
Parliamentary elections in Greece
1885 in Greece
Greece
1880s in Greek politics
Charilaos Trikoupis